La Memoria del agua may refer to:

  Memory of Water (film), 1994 film
  The Memory of Water (film), 2015 film